Parka Posht-e Mehdikhani (also Romanized as Parkā Posht-e Mehdīkhānī; also known as Mehdīkhānī and Parkā Posht) is a village in Kurka Rural District, in the Central District of Astaneh-ye Ashrafiyeh County, Gilan Province, Iran. At the 2006 census, its population was 818, in 221 families.

References 

Populated places in Astaneh-ye Ashrafiyeh County